is a Japanese judoka. He won a gold medal 4 times at the World Championships.

He is from Higashikagawa, Kagawa. After graduation from Tenri University in 1973, he belonged to Kuraray. One year after, He got a job at Kyoto Sangyo University and among his students was Olympic Games champion in 1984, Yoshiyuki Matsuoka.

As of 2010, Fujii coaches judo at his alma mater, Tenri University, where he previously studied as an undergraduate.

References

External links
 
 

Japanese male judoka
Sportspeople from Kagawa Prefecture
1950 births
Living people
World judo champions